The Bolshaya Koltsevaya line, known in English as the Big Circle Line, designated Line 11 and 11A is a rapid transit line of the Moscow Metro. It is the third circle line on the system, running outside of the existing circle Koltsevaya line and interlocking with Moscow Central Circle.

The first section of the line opened on 26 February 2018 with the remaining stations opened on 1 March 2023. In November 2017 the city estimated the total cost of the project at 501 billion rubles, up from earlier estimates of 378.9 billion rubles.

Formerly known as the Third Interchange Contour, the city adopted "Bolshaya koltsevaya liniya" as the official name of the line after a vote via the "Active Citizen" web portal.

Name
The working name of the project since inception was the Third Interchange Contour; however, prior to the opening of the line, the city authorities consulted residents to help decide on the name. In an initial survey on the Active Citizen survey website in October 2017, only 34% of the city’s residents voted to keep the working name.

Although retaining the working name was the most popular option, members of the city’s council on transportation infrastructure suggested another vote. Two reasons cited by transport expert Kirill Yankov were that all of the line’s names to this point were in the feminine grammatical gender and that all the other line names were generally understood from a point of view of geography. The city held another vote on its website to allow citizens to choose between the existing name or the Bolshaya Koltsevaya line (Large Circle Line). Of the alternate names suggested by voters in the first vote, Bolshaya Koltsevaya was the most popular, with 9,000 votes.

In the second vote, Bolshaya Koltsevaya was selected with 53.3% of the votes versus 36.5% for the Third Interchange Contour.

Development

The entire project was supposed to be completed by 2020–2021. By 2018, the completion date had been postponed until 2023.

First sections

The five stations from Petrovsky Park to Delovoy Tsentr opened on 26 February 2018. Savyolovskaya was opened on 30 December 2018.

Further extension
The northeastern section was initially scheduled to be completed in 2018, but was delayed for two years until it was opened on 27 March 2020 and 31 December 2020. On 1 April 2021, the section between Khoroshyovskaya and Mnyovniki was opened. This section includes the part of the line from Elektrozavodskaya to Nizhegorodskaya. The existing, short, three-station Kakhovskaya line was incorporated into the line. Kakhovskaya was reopened on 7 December 2021 after reconstruction within the segment to Mnyovniki. The sections from Savyolovskaya to Elektrozavodskaya and from Kakhovskaya to Nizhegorodskaya opened on 1 March 2023.

Stations

Main circle

MIBC branch (11A) 
Initial route of the Line 11, designated as 11A since December 2020, when the new part of the main circle was opened

Maps

References

External links

 
Moscow Metro lines
Railway loop lines